The 2023 Toronto FC II season is the eighth season of play in the club's history and their second season in MLS Next Pro.

Team Roster
MLS Next Pro allows for up to 35 players on a roster. Roster slots 1 through 24 are reserved for players on professional contracts. The remaining 11 slots are for amateur MLS Academy players (who are unpaid, must be under the age of 21, be part of the team's academy, and have never signed a professional contract or played in the NCAA).

Coaching staff

Transfers
Note: All figures in United States dollars.

In

Transferred In

Loaned in

Out

Transferred out

Loaned out

Pre-season and friendlies

Competitions

MLS Next Pro

Standings

Match Results

Statistics

Goals
{| class="wikitable sortable" style="width:60%; text-align:center"
!width=15|Rank
!width=15|Nation
!width=130|Player
!width=50|MLS Next Pro
!width=50|Playoffs
!width=50|Total
|-
|1||||    ||    ||     ||     
|-
|colspan="3"|Own goals 
|    ||    ||  
|- class="sortbottom"
! colspan="3"|Totals||   ||   ||

Shutouts
{| class="wikitable sortable" style="width:60%; text-align:center"
!width=15|Rank
!width=15|Nation
!width=130|Player
!width=15|Pos.
!width=50|MLS Next Pro
!width=50|Playoffs
!width=50|Total
|-
|1||||        || GK ||    ||   ||    
|-
! colspan="4"|Totals||  ||   ||

References

Toronto FC II seasons
Toronto FC II
Toronto FC II
Toronto FC II